Rageshree is a raga in Indian classical music, popular in both Carnatic music and Hindustani music. It is from the Khamaj thaat. It is pentatonic in aaroha, hexatonic in avaroha.

Film songs

Language:Tamil

External links
SRA on Samay and Ragas
SRA on Ragas and Thaats
Rajan Parrikar on Ragas
Film Songs in Rag Rageshree

Rageshree